Freedom Fighters & Rehabilitation Division, a division of the Ministry of Home Affairs of India, manages the Swathantra Sainik Samman Pension Scheme - a national pension scheme introduced in 1972 for Freedom Fighters (Swatantrata Sainiks) and their dependents. The division also handles rehabilitation assistance for refugees and migrants from Pakistan, Sri Lanka and Tibet. However, there was significant resistance to implementing the scheme. For example, it took 24 years of legal fighting for S. M. Shanmugam to finally receive his pension in August 2006.

Details of scheme

Definition of eligible freedom fighters 

The freedom fighters pension scheme was instituted in 1972. Eligible as freedom fighters are people who;

 had suffered an imprisonment of 6 months or more in connection with the freedom struggle (3 months in the case of women and SC/ST freedom fighters.).
 remained underground for six months or more.
 were interned in their homes or external from their district for six months or more.
 whose property was confiscated or attached and sold due to participation in the national freedom struggle.
 were permanently incapacitated during firing or lathi charge.
 lost government employments due to the participation in the freedom struggle.
 were awarded the punishment of 10 strokes of canning/flogging/whipping.

Eligible movements and mutinies for the pension 

The following movements and mutinies are recognized by the central government of India for the purpose of the freedom fighters pensione scheme administered by the division:

 Ambala Cantonment Army Revolt (1943)
 Anti-Independent Travancore Movement 
 Aranya Satyagraha of Karnataka (1939–40)
 Arya Samaj Movement in the erstwhile Hyderabad State (1947–48)
 Border Camp Cases in erstwhile Hyderabad State (1947–48)
 Chengannur Riot Case 
 Chauri Chaura incident (1922)
 Dadara Nagar Haveli Movement.
 Ghadar Movement
 Goa Liberation Movement
 Gurdwara Reform Movement (1920–25) (including: a) Taran Taran Morcha, Nankana Tragedy of February (1920), The Golden Temple Ke Affairs (Morcha Chabian Saheb), Guru ka Bagh Morcha, Babbar Akali Movement, Jaito Morcha, Bhai Pheru Morcha, The Sikh Conspiracy (Golden Temple) of 1924)
 Harse Chhina Mogha Morcha (1946–47)
 Hollwell monument removal movement (1940) by Subhas Chandra Bose at Calcutta
 Indian Independence League (1942 to 1946)
 Jhansi Regiment Case in Army (1940)
 Kadakkal Riot Case
 Kalipattanam Agitation (1941–42)
 Kallara-Pangode Struggle
 Karivelloor Movement 
 Kauvambai Movement 
 Kayyur incident 
 Khilafat Movement
 Kirti Kisan Movement (1927)
 Madurai Conspiracy Case (1945–47)
 Malabar Special Police Strike (MSP Strike) 
 Merger with India movements in the former French and Portugueses possessions in India
 Moplah Rebellion (1921–22)
 Morazha Movement 
 Naujawan Bharat Sabha (1926–31)
 Qissa Khwani massacre (Peshawar Kand) in which members of the Royal Garhwal Rifles took part
 Praja Mandal Movement in the erstwhile Princely States (1939–49)
 Punnapra-Vayalar uprising (1946)
 Quit India Movement (1942)
 Rani Jhansi Regiment and Azad Hind Fauj (Indian National Army) (1943–45)
 Read Leaf Conspiracy Case (1931)
 Royal Indian Navy Mutiny, 1946
 Suez Canal Army Revolt in 1943 
 Vattiyoorkavu Conference

See also 

 Indian independence movement
 Indian National Army
 Pensions in India

References

Ministry of Home Affairs (India)
Indian independence movement
Indian National Army
Pensions in India